Cocco Bill is an Italian comics character by Benito Jacovitti. He is the star of a parody Western comic set in hypothetical places in the Far West. He is a hot-tempered gunslinger who drinks chamomile tea. Occasionally mocked for this, Bill responds with violence. Despite these outbursts, Cocco Bill is a good guy, and always helps sheriffs to capture criminals. After Jacovitti's death in 1997 the series was continued by Luca Salvagno.

Cocco Bill's horse is called Trottalemme (which literally means "trot slowly"). The animal reasons like humans, smokes cigarettes, drinks tequila and also dreams at night.

Style 
As in most of Jacovitti's comics, the page is full of strange things: all around the place one can find salami (sometimes legged), worms with legs and hats, fish bones (typically close to the artist's signature), as well as horses with only two legs ridden by a man with four legs, and other absurdities. Many of the stories themselves are vignettes, pertaining to a surrealist American west (some issues happens in various other countries, like Canada). Most revolve around the titular character going to a new town and having to deal with whatever situation or mission is given to him by the local authorities.

Adaptations 

In 2001 Cocco Bill was adapted into an animated TV series, consisting of 104 episodes of in total 13 minutes in length per episode.

References

External links 
 Cocco Bill – Wild West parody by Benito Jacovitti
 Cocco Bill and Jacovitti bibliography
 Cocco Bill comics

1957 comics debuts
Comics adapted into animated series
Comics adapted into television series
Comics characters introduced in 1957
Italian comics
Italian comics characters
Italian comics titles
Western (genre) comics
Western (genre) comics characters
Western (genre) gunfighters